Box Canyon is a box canyon in Ouray County, Colorado, United States.

Description
A mining camp was established in the canyon that helped the city of Ouray establish itself as a permanent community. Box Canyon is home to Box Canyon Falls, a  waterfall, with quartzite walls that extend almost one hundred feet past the falls. Access to the canyon is through a short,  foot trail to the base of the falls or a steep trail leading to the top of the falls. A fee is required to use the trails to the canyon.

See also

References

External links

Canyons and gorges of Colorado
Landforms of Ouray County, Colorado